The Orquestra de la Comunitat Valenciana, is an orchestra based in Valencia, Spain and the resident orchestra of Valencia’s opera house, Palau de les Arts Reina Sofía.

History 
The Orchestra was created in 2006 to be the orchestra of the new opera house, Palau de les Arts Reina Sofía. The first music director of the orchestra was the French-born American conductor Lorin Maazel. He was succeeded in 2011 by Omer Meir Wellber.

Festival of the Mediterranean 
Each year the conductor Zubin Mehta directs this festival which includes several opera programs, concerts and recitals.

See also
 Valencia Orchestra
 Cor de la Generalitat Valenciana

References

External links
 Orquestra de la Comunitat Valenciana - Official website

Spanish orchestras
Symphony orchestras
Musical groups established in 2006
Culture in Valencia